The tornado outbreak sequence of May 5–10, 2015 was a six-day outbreak of tornado activity that affected the Great Plains of the United States in early May 2015. On May 6, strong tornadoes impacted the Oklahoma City area, along with rural parts of Kansas, Texas, Arkansas, South Dakota, and Nebraska. The outbreak coincided with major flooding, with large amounts of rain falling in parts of Nebraska, Kansas, Oklahoma, and Texas. The National Weather Service forecast office in Norman, Oklahoma issued a "flash flood emergency" for Oklahoma City following record-breaking rainfall that occurred in the area that evening. The outbreak sequence resulted in five tornado-related deaths, along with two flood-related deaths. A total of 127 tornadoes were confirmed and rated as a result of this outbreak sequence. Damage from the outbreak was estimated at $1.5 billion.

Meteorological synopsis
On May 6, a series of severe thunderstorms produced flash flooding, hail, damaging winds, and tornadoes in Oklahoma and western north Texas. In Oklahoma, this event was brought on by a shortwave moving through the area. Kansas's first tornado of the day was an EF0 that developed in Lincoln County and caused minor damage at a cemetery within the town of Lincoln, Kansas. In Oklahoma, severe weather first appeared in southwestern parts of Oklahoma near Lawton, with the first Severe Thunderstorm Warning of the day being issued at 12:46 p.m. CDT and the first Tornado Warning being issued at 3:45 p.m. CDT. An EF3 tornado developed near Mount Hope, Kansas tracked through Harvey County, crossing Highway 50 west of Halstead and dissipating as it headed north, causing major tree damage and destroying a farmhouse. A long-tracked EF2 passed near Scandia, Kansas and into Nebraska, while another EF3 completely destroyed a house near Munden, Kansas. One of these tornadoes caused EF3 damage and several critical injuries in the southeastern part of Oklahoma City, and another EF3 struck Bridge Creek. As a result of heavy flooding, multiple Flash Flood Warnings, including a flash flood emergency, were issued for the Oklahoma City metropolitan area, and in the hours following midnight, the storms merged into a complex and maintained eastward movement. Oklahoma City recorded their 3rd wettest day on record, and wettest day on record in the month of May.

A few less intense tornadoes occurred on May 7 and May 8 across an area extending from Colorado to Texas. Another wave of significant tornado activity occurred on May 9 throughout an area extending from Nebraska to Texas. This included a large EF3 tornado that caused major damage and killed one person near Cisco, Texas.

Destructive tornado activity continued on May 10, as a high-end EF2 tornado struck the town of Delmont, South Dakota, where severe structural damage and multiple injuries occurred. Later that evening, an EF1 multiple-vortex tornado struck Lake City, Iowa, where homes were damaged, trees and power lines were downed, and the local high school had its roof torn off. Significant tornadoes continued to touch down after sunset later that night, and the town of Van, Texas was devastated by a strong EF3 tornado, where two people were killed and at least 47 others were injured. Two other fatalities occurred in Nashville, Arkansas when an EF2 tornado struck a mobile home park.

Winter storm side
The system also produced a prolific winter storm in the mountainous regions further west. It first started spreading snow in the Sierra Mountains from May 6–9. Afterwards, it began to move northeastwards towards the High Plains. The snowstorm dumped up to 2 feet of snow in the mountains of Colorado and up to 12 inches in the lower elevations.

Confirmed tornadoes

May 5 event

May 6 event

May 7 event

May 8 event

May 9 event

May 10 event

Tigernado
On the evening of May 6, an EF0 tornado caused damage at the Tiger Safari Zoological Park located near Tuttle in Grady County, Oklahoma. An EF3 and two other EF0 tornadoes also occurred close to the attraction that evening. Due to the reported damage, Grady County was under strict warnings regarding the possibility that the tigers, and other creatures, might have gotten out of their habitats. Bo Wright, a web designer from Oklahoma, heard of the storms and possibly free-roaming predators, and thought instantly of the movie Sharknado and decided to design a false movie poster and T-shirt as a joke. Locals referred to the event as the "Tigernado" on social media, and memes began to circulate the internet. Tigernado is a portmanteau up of "tiger" and "tornado".

Timeline for Grady County

Tigernado T-shirt Fundraiser
Seeing this popularity, Wright decided to sell the T-shirts for $20 each and donate the money directly to Serve Moore, a nonprofit organization dedicated to helping victims of natural disasters.

Park damage
The park director, Bill Meadows, estimated the total damages, including those from the wind, flooding, and debris, to be around $50,000. This total also includes the damage to the enclosure of an American black bear named Smokey. Smokey's habitat sustained considerable damage in the storm, and the bear had to be transferred to the Garold Wayne Zoo during the rebuilding of his enclosure. Though his fences were damaged, his fear of the storms kept him hunkered down like the other creatures. Neither he, nor any of the others, were actually roaming loose.

Notes

References

External links
May 6th, 2015 Severe Weather and Flash Flood Event from NWS Norman
Central/South Central Kansas Tornadoes – May 6, 2015 from NWS Wichita

Tornadoes of 2015
2015 natural disasters in the United States
May 2015 events in the United States
F3 tornadoes